Hardeep Tauo Toganwalia (born 6 April 1984) is a professional kabaddi player. He plays as a stopper in circle style kabaddi. He is known for his unique playing style, and affectionately known by the name "Tauo". Tauo stands for Father's elder brother in Haryanvi. Opponents gave him the nickname and he has it tattooed on the knuckles of his left fist.



Early life
Tauo was born in village Toganwal, Kapurthala district (Punjab). He was born in a Sikh family as Hardeep Singh Sra on 6 April 1984, son of Mohinder Singh Sra and Surinder Kaur Sra.
He completed his schooling from —M.D.S.D senior secondary school, Kapurthala. Tauo won the best athlete award in Khalsa College, Sultanpur in 2003. While completing his graduation from DAV college, Amritsar he won a silver medal in judo in University competitions in 2004 . Gradually he started to steep towards Indian power sports like wrestling and kabaddi. Tauo mastered the technicality of these sports at his village Toganwal.

Kabaddi career
Tauo started his career in kabaddi with Sher-E-Punjab Kabaddi Academy, California in 2005. Since then he has been representing internationally for many countries like Philippines, Germany, Poland, Norway, United States, Italy, Dubai and Canada. He is associated with kabaddi clubs like Azaad, International Punjabi Sports & Cultural Club, Lion's, Malton & Brampton in Canada.  Tauo leads the Azaad Kabaddi Club as the Captain since year 2008, till date.
His performances has helped him to achieve the throne of captaincy (Canada team) for the 2012 Kabaddi World Cup.
He is often seen promoting body building and kabaddi competitions locally and internationally and encouraging the youth of Punjab to stay away from drugs and advance towards sports.

References

Further sources

1984 births
Indian kabaddi players
Punjabi people
Living people
Kabaddi players from Punjab, India
People from Kapurthala district